James Thomson (born in Dumbarton) was a Scottish professional footballer who played as an outside left. During his career, he played for a number of clubs, including short spells at Clydebank Juniors, Renton, Manchester United, Dumbarton Harp and Clyde, followed by 11 years with St Mirren.

During his time at Manchester United, he made six appearances, scoring one goal, during the 1913–14 Football League season. He was part of the St Mirren team which won the Scottish Cup in 1926, beating Celtic (he had scored the winning goal in their semi-final victory over Rangers).

References

19th-century births
Year of death missing
Scottish footballers
Sportspeople from Dumbarton
Footballers from West Dunbartonshire
Association football outside forwards
Clydebank Juniors F.C. players
Manchester United F.C. players
St Mirren F.C. players
Clyde F.C. players
Dumbarton Harp F.C. players
Dumbarton F.C. players
English Football League players
Scottish Football League players
Renton F.C. players